Travkino is a rural locality (a selo) in Radchenskoye Rural Settlement, Bogucharsky District, Voronezh Oblast, Russia. The population was 428 as of 2010. There are 4 streets.

Geography 
Travkino is located 28 km southwest of Boguchar (the district's administrative centre) by road. Radchenskoye is the nearest rural locality.

References 

Rural localities in Bogucharsky District